Simon Sargon (6 April 1938 Bombay, India - 25 December 2022 Kensington, Maryland) was an American composer, pianist, and music educator of Israeli and Indian descent. He studied at Brandeis University and at the Juilliard School under Sergius Kagen. For many years, Sargon was Jennie Tourel's accompanist, performing with her in concerts and master classes across the country and abroad. Among his compositions are symphonic works, chamber music pieces, choral works, art songs, and operas. He has been commissioned to write works for numerous organizations including the Texas Music Teachers Association, the Meadows Foundation, Yale University, Susquehanna University, the Dallas Holocaust Society, and the Dallas Symphony Orchestra, the last of which has premiered three of his works.

Sargon has received the Annual Award of Recognition from ASCAP (1991–present), was inducted as an Honorary Member of the American Conference of Cantors (2003), named a Finalist in the National Opera Association Composition Competition (1997); and awarded First Prize in the National Association of Teachers of Singing Musical Composition competition (1993).

Sargon has been on the staff of the New York City Opera, Connecticut Opera, Dallas Opera, and was the assistant conductor of the Concert Opera Association of New York, which gave concert performances of unknown and neglected operatic works at Philharmonic Hall.

He was the Professor of Composition at Southern Methodist University, and has  been on the faculty of Sarah Lawrence College and the Juilliard School. He also served as Head of the Voice Department at the Rubin Academy of Music in Jerusalem for many years.

In addition to teaching, Sargon was the Director of Music at Temple Emanu-El in Dallas, a position he held for more than twenty-five years.

Sources
Opera Glass
Profile at Southern Methodist University

External links
Official Website
Interview with Simon Sargon, December 21, 2006

American male classical composers
American classical composers
Israeli composers
American opera composers
Male opera composers
1938 births
Brandeis University alumni
Juilliard School alumni
Juilliard School faculty
Southern Methodist University faculty
Sarah Lawrence College faculty
Texas classical music
Living people
American music educators